Green Township is one of fourteen townships in Madison County, Indiana, United States. As of the 2010 census, its population was 7,537 and it contained 2,758 housing units.

History
Green Township was organized in 1826. It was named for Nathanael Greene.

Geography

Cities, towns, villages
 Ingalls
 Pendleton (west edge)

Unincorporated towns
 Alfont at 
 Hardscrabble at 
 Sunview at

Cemeteries
The township contains these eight cemeteries: Doty, Fausset, Gravel Lawn, Hiday, Jones, Mount Carmel, Nicholson and Pleasant Valley.

Major highways
  Interstate 69
  U.S. Route 36
  State Road 38
  State Road 67

Education
 South Madison Community School Corporation

Green Township residents may obtain a free library card from the Pendleton Community Public Library in Pendleton.

Political districts
 Indiana's 5th congressional district
 State House District 37
 State Senate District 25

References
 
 United States Census Bureau 2008 TIGER/Line Shapefiles
 IndianaMap

External links
 Indiana Township Association
 United Township Association of Indiana
 City-Data.com page for Green Township
 Green Township History

Townships in Madison County, Indiana
Townships in Indiana